Peter Jessop is an American actor who is known for his video game voice acting. He is known for the voice of Sovereign in Mass Effect, the voice of Miraak, the primary antagonist of The Elder Scrolls V: Skyrim – Dragonborn DLC, and the voice of Paladin Danse from the video game Fallout 4. He also voices the male exo player character in Destiny 2.

Filmography

Film

Television

Video games

Documentary
Bear Attack – Himself/narrator
The Freemasons – Candidate
The Science of Lust – Narrator

Miscellaneous
Eye See You

Miniseries
World War I

References

External links
 

Living people
American male film actors
American male television actors
American male video game actors
American male voice actors
People from Natick, Massachusetts
20th-century American male actors
21st-century American male actors
Year of birth missing (living people)